Justice Nicholson may refer to:

Alfred O. P. Nicholson, associate justice of the Tennessee Supreme Court
George M. Nicholson, associate justice of the Oklahoma Supreme Court
Joseph Hopper Nicholson, associate justice of the Maryland Court of Appeals